McComber is an unincorporated community in Eagles Nest Township, Saint Louis County, Minnesota, United States.

The community is located between Tower and Ely on State Highway 1 (MN 1) and State Highway 169 (MN 169).

Bear Head Lake State Park is nearby.

McComber is location of the former McComber iron mine which was located on the north side of Armstrong Lake.  

The boundary line between Eagles Nest Township and Morse Township is also in the vicinity.

References

Unincorporated communities in Minnesota
Populated places in St. Louis County, Minnesota